Romain Riccardi (born 26 July 1988) is an Italian male BMX rider, representing his nation at international competitions. He competed in the time trial event at the 2015 UCI BMX World Championships.

References

External links
 
 

1988 births
Living people
BMX riders
Italian male cyclists
European Games competitors for Italy
Cyclists at the 2015 European Games
Place of birth missing (living people)